Julieta Sáenz (born 12 April 1954) is a Mexican gymnast. She competed in six events at the 1968 Summer Olympics.

References

1954 births
Living people
Mexican female artistic gymnasts
Olympic gymnasts of Mexico
Gymnasts at the 1968 Summer Olympics
Sportspeople from Mexico City
20th-century Mexican women